Kevin Spacey is an American actor who began his acting career on stage. His film career started in the late 1980s after small parts in Heartburn (1986) and Working Girl (1988). In the 90s, he had supporting roles in the films Glengarry Glen Ross (1992) and Iron Will (1994) before being cast in the role of Roger "Verbal" Kint in the 1995 The Usual Suspects which earned him an Academy Award for Best Supporting Actor. That same year he played serial killer and villain in Se7en opposite Brad Pitt and Morgan Freeman. He went on to star in L.A. Confidential (1997),  Midnight in the Garden of Good and Evil (1997), The Negotiator (1998), and American Beauty (1999). The latter earned him his second Academy Award, but this time for Best Actor.

In the 2000s, he appeared in the films Pay It Forward with Helen Hunt (2000), Superman Returns as Lex Luthor (2006), 21 with Jim Sturgess (2008), the latter which he also produced. In 2011, he co-starred with Paul Bettany and Jeremy Irons in the drama film Margin Call. That same year, he played antagonist Dave Harken in the comedy Horrible Bosses with Jason Bateman, a role he reprised in the 2014 sequel Horrible Bosses 2. He played Doc in the 2017 film Baby Driver with Ansel Elgort and Ron Levin in the 2018 film Billionaire Boys Club.

From 2013 to 2017, he played Francis "Frank" Underwood in the TV series House of Cards.

Film

Television

Video games

Theatre

See also

References

Spacey, Kevin
Spacey, Kevin
Filmography